Curling was a demonstration sport at the 1932 Winter Olympics. The curling venue was the Olympic Indoor Arena in Lake Placid, New York. Eight teams from two countries (4 American teams and 4 Canadian Teams) competed in this event. The matches were held on February 4 and 5, 1932.  Each of the Canadian teams played against each of the American teams.

Event summary

The medalists were from the Canadian provinces of Manitoba, Ontario, and Quebec. The highest placed American team was from Connecticut in 4th place.  The other American teams were from New York, Michigan and Massachusetts.

Teams
Teams representing Canada:

Teams representing the United States:

Standings

Draw 1
Afternoon, February 4

Draw 2
Evening, February 4

Draw 3
Morning, February 5

Draw 4
Afternoon, February 5

References

III Olympic Winter Games Lake Placid 1932, 1932 (digitized version)

 
1932 Winter Olympics events
1932
1932 in curling
International curling competitions hosted by the United States
Curling in New York (state)